Crenulostrigus is a genus of beetles in the family Carabidae, containing the following species:

 Crenulostrigus palpalis (Straneo, 1942)
 Crenulostrigus profundus (Straneo, 1942)

References

Pterostichinae